The boys' football tournament at the 2010 Summer Youth Olympics took place at the Jalan Besar Stadium in Singapore.

Medalists

Participants

Africa

Zimbabwe represented Africa at the tournament. The U-15 team is made up of players from various schools in the country's ten provinces, with the squad spending six months training together in the build-up to the Singapore 2010. During the process they played five tune-up games against local youth sides, racking up 39 goals in the process at an average of nearly eight goals per game. The team went through five week-long camps over a three-month period, also playing friendlies against local club sides and school teams before arriving in Singapore. Their two most recent results were a 5–0 win over local club Dynamos FC and a 3–1 victory over Gunnas FC.

Asia

Singapore represented Asia at the tournament. As hosts, they automatically qualified for the tournament. Kadir Yahaya, a former Singapore international who took over in February, guided the Young Lions. Under the 44-year-old, the youth side have spent several months in the build-up to the tournament in training camps at home and abroad, making them one of the competition's best-prepared teams. A short trip to Melbourne in March was followed by another two-week camp in May in England, during which Yahaya's outfits won two of their five games against some local age-group teams, with the highlight a 3–2 victory over a Tottenham Hotspur academy team.

Europe

Montenegro represented Europe at the tournament. UEFA decided that the four lowest-ranked associations at junior level would fight out for a place at the Youth Olympics. Montenegro overwhelmed San Marino 4–0 to book a meeting with Albania for the right to represent Europe in Singapore. At this match, the Montenegrin goalkeeper extinguished an attack by handling the ball outside his penalty area. He was consequently sent off. Albania had the majority of the possession, but Montenegro eked out a 2–1 victory.

North and Central America

Haiti represented North and Central America at the tournament. The nation's Football Association was only informed of its inclusion in the global competition in June following the withdrawal of Cuba. As a result, Haiti's preparations were likely less complete than some of their fellow participants.

South America

Bolivia represented South America at the tournament. The squad Douglas Cuenca will be taking to Singapore features several members of the side that contested the 2009 South American U-15 Championships and then won bronze at the Odesur Games earlier this year. The Bolivians began their preparations for the Youth Games early in July in Argentina, earning a 2–1 win over the USA and a 3–3 draw with the Argentinos Juniors U-20 side.

Oceania

Vanuatu represented Oceania at the tournament, coached Etienne Mermer, who is hoping to pass on the experience of three World Cup qualifying campaigns to his young charges. The defensive midfielder from Tafea, who recently retired from the national team, has looked after the young Vanuatu team since last year. The vast majority of the squad hail from the Teouma Academy, with the team's most recent match an outing against the senior Academy side, which finished in a 2–2 draw. Perhaps the most notable squad member is towering 193 cm goalkeeper Seiloni Iaruel, with the youngster having already featured in the senior squad.

Preliminary round

Group C

Group D

Semi-finals

5th-place match

Bronze-medal match

Final

Final ranking

Goalscorers

6 goals
 Rodrigo Mejido

4 goals
 Luís Banegas

3 goals
 Ammirul Emmran
 Muhaimin Suhaimi

2 goals
 Jorge Alpire
 Paul Arano

2 goals
 Jean Bonhomme
 Daniel Gedeon
 Aleksandar Boljević
 Nebojša Kosović
 Hanafi Akbar
 Andre Kalselik

1 goal
 Carlos Añez
 José Guthrie

1 goal
 Yasser Manzur
 Jorge Sabía
 Romero Vaca
 Jovan Baošić
 Žarko Grbović
 Brandon Koh
 Jeffrey Lightfoot
 Petch Ham
 Stanford Chavanigra
 Albert Kusemwa

References
 Match Results

External links
Boys' Youth Olympic Football Tournament Singapore 2010 , FIFA.com
FIFA Technical Report

Football at the 2010 Summer Youth Olympics